Capraiellus is a genus of non-cosmopolitan cockroaches in the family Ectobiidae.

Species
The Cockroach Species File describes the following:
Capraiellus haeckelii (Bolívar, 1876)  synonym Ectobius panzeri servillei Fernandes, 1962 
Capraiellus panzeri (Stephens, 1835) synonym Ectobius panzeri nigripes Fernandes, 1962
Capraiellus tamaninii (Galvagni, 1972)

References

External links
 
 

Cockroaches
Cockroach genera